The 2016 Southern Conference women's basketball tournament was held between Thursday, March 3 and Sunday, March 6 in Asheville, North Carolina, at the U.S. Cellular Center.

Seeds
Teams are seeded by record within the conference, with a tiebreaker system to seed teams with identical conference records.

Schedule
All tournament games are nationally televised on an ESPN network:

Bracket

References

Tournament
SoCon women's
College basketball tournaments in North Carolina
Southern Conference women's basketball tournament
Southern Conference women's basketball tournament
Southern Conference women's basketball tournament